Clarence J. "Bud" Brown Jr. (June 18, 1927 – January 26, 2022) was an American politician and publisher who served as a Republican United States Representative from the 7th District of Ohio, from 1965 to 1983. He also served as the United States Deputy Secretary of Commerce and Acting Secretary of Commerce in the Reagan administration from 1983 to 1988.

Early life and education
Brown was born in Columbus, Ohio, the son of Ethel McKinney and United States Representative Clarence J. Brown. He attended Western High School in Washington, D.C. and graduated from Duke University in 1947 and Harvard Business School, with an M.B.A., in 1949.

Career
Brown served in the United States Navy from 1944 to 1946 (V-12 Navy College Training Program) and again from 1950 to 1953 in the Korean War. Before entering the service, Brown had started working in the newspaper business for his father's family-owned Brown Publishing Company, from youth to 1953, and from 1957 to 2010. In the late 1950s and early 1960s, Brown and his family lived in Urbana, Ohio, 90 miles north of Cincinnati, where the headquarters of the publishing company was based.

Brown served as president from 1965 to 1976, and later as chairman of the board. The company had interests in a wide network of newspapers across the country but, due to the rapidly changing business as a result of technology, it ceased operations in 2010 after 90 years.

Political career
Brown was first elected to the Eighty-ninth Congress, by special election, to fill the vacancy caused by the death of his father Clarence Brown in 1965, and reelected to the eight succeeding Congresses (November 2, 1965 to January 3, 1983). He was not a candidate for reelection to the Ninety-eighth Congress in 1982, as he ran for Governor of Ohio that year, losing to Richard Celeste.

He became involved in Republican Party politics, serving as a delegate to the Republican National Conventions in 1968, 1972, 1976, and 1984. Ronald Reagan appointed Brown as Deputy Secretary of Commerce and Acting Secretary of Commerce; he served from 1983 to 1988. He was a member of the board of the Overseas Private Investment Corporation from 1988 to 1989, and he was president and chief executive officer of the United States Capitol Historical Society from 1992 to 1999.

Personal life and death
Brown was married to Joyce Helen (née Eldridge) Brown, a conductor, composer and classical pianist. They had four children: Beth (c. 1957–1964); Clancy, an actor, Cathy, and Roy, who followed his father into newspaper publishing and politics.

Bud Brown died in Urbana, Ohio, on January 26, 2022, at the age of 94.

References

External links

|-

|-

|-

1927 births
2022 deaths
Bud
Duke University alumni
Editors of Ohio newspapers
Harvard Business School alumni
Republican Party members of the United States House of Representatives from Ohio
Military personnel from Ohio
Overseas Private Investment Corporation officials
People from Clinton County, Ohio
People from Urbana, Ohio
Politicians from Columbus, Ohio
United States Deputy Secretaries of Commerce
United States Navy officers
United States Navy personnel of World War II
United States Navy personnel of the Korean War